A Christmas Celebration is the second studio album released by the group Celtic Woman.

Background
A Christmas Celebration was recorded in and released worldwide on 3 October 2006. The album, like the group's self-titled debut album, was produced and arranged by David Downes and features vocalists Chloë Agnew, Órla Fallon, Lisa Kelly, and Méav Ní Mhaolchatha, with violinist Máiréad Nesbitt.

In response to the reception earned for their following album, PBS concert special and DVD release A New Journey, a one-off live performance took place on 18 July 2007 at the Helix Theatre in Dublin, Ireland – the same location where the recording for the accompanying PBS concert special and DVD release for the group's debut album was held back in 2004. The concert began airing on PBS and was released on DVD in November 2007.

Track listing 
Note: All songs traditional, arranged by David Downes unless where noted.

Personnel

Celtic Woman
 Chloë Agnew – vocals
 Órla Fallon – vocals, harp
 Lisa Kelly – vocals
 Méav Ní Mhaolchatha – vocals
 Máiréad Nesbitt – fiddle

Band
 David Downes – keyboards, piano, conductor
 Raymond Fean – percussion
 Nicholas Bailey – percussion
 Eoghan O'Niell – bass guitar
 Desmond Moore – guitars
 Martin Johnston – cello
 Andreja Malir – harp
 John O'Brien – uileann pipes, whistles

Aontas Choral Ensemble
 Rosemary Collier – director

The Irish Film Orchestra
 John Page – conductor
 Alan Smale – concertmaster

Reception

Chart history

Charts

Certifications

References

Celtic Woman albums
2006 Christmas albums
Christmas albums by Irish artists
Manhattan Records albums
Celtic Christmas albums